A Parisian Romance is a 1932 American drama film directed by Chester M. Franklin and starring Lew Cody, Marion Shilling and Gilbert Roland. It is based on the play of the same title by Octave Feuillet, which had previously been made into a 1916 silent film.

Synopsis
In Paris, a notorious womanizer falls in love with a young woman who at last makes him mend his ways.

Cast
 Lew Cody as Baron  
 Marion Shilling as Claudette  
 Gilbert Roland as Victor  
 Joyce Compton as Marcelle  
 Yola d'Avril as Pauline  
 Nicholas Soussanin as Emil  
 George J. Lewis as Pierre  
 Bryant Washburn as Briac  
 Helen Jerome Eddy as Yvonne  
 Paul Porcasi as Deville  
 James Eagles as Paul  
 Luis Alberni as Pascal 
 Nadine Dore as Marie

References

Bibliography
 Pitts, Michael R. Poverty Row Studios, 1929–1940: An Illustrated History of 55 Independent Film Companies, with a Filmography for Each. McFarland & Company, 2005.

External links
 

1932 films
1932 drama films
American drama films
Films directed by Chester Franklin
Films set in Paris
American black-and-white films
1930s English-language films
1930s American films